A New Athens is the sixth studio album by English rock band The Bluetones. It was released on 31 May 2010 on CIA Recordings.

The album failed to chart in the Top 200 UK Albums Chart after its first week on release.

The first single was "Carry Me Home", which released on 13 June 2010, on download. A second single, "Golden Soul", was released on 14 November 2010, on download.

Track listing
All tracks written by: Chesters, Devlin, Morriss, Morriss:

 "The Notes Between the Notes Between the Notes"
 "Firefly"
 "A New Athens"
 "Culling Song"
 "Into The Red"
 "Golden Soul"
 "The Day That Never Was"
 "Carry Me Home"
 "Half the Size of Nothing"
 "Haunted by You"
 "Pranchestonelle"
 "Hey Schmoopy" (Hidden Track)

Personnel
 Adam Devlin – guitar
 Eds Chesters – drums
 Mark Morriss – vocals
 Scott Morriss – bass
 Alex Richards – keyboards

References

2010 albums
The Bluetones albums